Prez is a municipality in the district of Sarine in the canton of Fribourg in Switzerland. On 1 January 2020, the former municipalities of Corserey, Noréaz and Prez-vers-Noréaz merged to form the new municipality of Prez.

World heritage site
The former municipality of Noréaz is home to the En Praz des Gueux prehistoric pile-dwelling (or stilt house) settlements that are part of the Prehistoric Pile dwellings around the Alps UNESCO World Heritage Site.

En Praz des Gueux is the only prehistoric lakeside settlement on the banks of a small lake in the Canton of Fribourg. The site is dated to the classic Cortaillod era (4000-3500 BC). The site was discovered by accident in 1971 in a boggy area near the present shore of the Lac de Seedorf.

History

Corserey
Corserey is first mentioned around 1150-62 as Corserei.

Noréaz
Noréaz is first mentioned in 1134 as Noarea.

Prez-vers-Noréaz
Prez-vers-Noréaz is first mentioned in 1156 as de Pratellis.

Geography

Demographics

Historic Population
The historical population is given in the following chart:

References

External links

Municipalities of the canton of Fribourg